Mark Steven Davis (born 1962) is the Chief United States district judge of the United States District Court for the Eastern District of Virginia.

Education and career

Born in Portsmouth, Virginia, Davis attended Longwood College (now Longwood University) in Farmville, VA, transferring to and receiving a Bachelor of Arts degree from the University of Virginia in 1984, and a Juris Doctor from Washington & Lee University School of Law in 1988. He was a law clerk for Judge John A. MacKenzie of the United States District Court for the Eastern District of Virginia from 1988 to 1989. He was in private practice in Virginia from 1989 to 2003. He was a judge on the Portsmouth Circuit Court, Third Judicial Circuit of Virginia from 2003 to 2008.

Federal judicial service

On November 15, 2007, Davis was nominated by President George W. Bush to a seat on the United States District Court for the Eastern District of Virginia vacated by T. S. Ellis III. Davis was confirmed by the United States Senate on June 10, 2008, and received his commission on June 23, 2008. He became Chief Judge on December 4, 2018.

References

Sources

1962 births
Living people
Judges of the United States District Court for the Eastern District of Virginia
United States district court judges appointed by George W. Bush
21st-century American judges
Washington and Lee University School of Law alumni
Politicians from Portsmouth, Virginia
Virginia circuit court judges